Year 1316 (MCCCXVI) was a leap year starting on Thursday (link will display the full calendar) of the Julian calendar.

Events 
 By place 

 Europe 
 February 22 – Battle of Picotin: Catalan forces led by Prince Ferdinand of Majorca, claimant to the Principality of Achaea, defeat the army of Princess Matilda of Hainaut, on the Peloponnese. During the battle, the Catalans kill 500 Burgundians and 700 native troops. The remnants of the Princess's army withdraw in haste, pursued by the Catalan cavalry; before they turn back to loot the abandoned Achaean camp.
 June 5 – King Louis X (the Quarrelsome) dies (possibly poisoning) during a game of tennis at Vincennes, leaving his pregnant wife Clementia of Hungary as his widow. Following Louis' death, his 23-year-old brother Philip is made regent for the remainder of Clementia's pregnancy. There are several potential candidates for the role of regent, his uncle Charles of Valois and Odo IV (or Eudes), duke of Burgundy.Gillmeister, Heiner (1998). Tennis: A Cultural History, pp. 17–21. London: Leicester University Press. . 
 July 5 – Battle of Manolada: Latin forces under Louis of Burgundy supported by Byzantine troops sent by governor Michael Kantakouzenos defeat the Catalan army under Ferdinand of Majorca. During the battle, Ferdinand is killed and John II of Nivelet, who claims the Principality of Achaea is executed on the field as a traitor. His lands are given to Louis' Burgundian followers.
 August – Battle of Gransee: A North German-Danish alliance, led by Henry II (the Lion), decisively defeats the forces under Waldemar the Great at Schulzendorf. During the battle, Waldemar escapes the battlefield, but his army – which consists largely of knights in armour is massacred. Later, the victorious alliance negotiates a peace treaty at Zehdenick.  

 England 
 Spring – Llywelyn Bren leads a revolt against English rule in Wales. Following an order to appear before King Edward II, Llywelyn Bren raises a rebel army and lays siege to Caerphilly Castle. The revolt spreads throughout the south Wales valleys (or Wear Cove), and other castles are attacked. Edward sends an expeditionary force led by Humphrey de Bohun to suppress the rebellion. In March, after a battle at Morgraig Castle Llywelyn Bren is forced to break off the Caerphilly siege after six weeks. He retreats to Glamorgan, and finally surrenders to Humphrey at Ystradfellte on March 18. 
 February – Battle of Skaithmuir: Scottish forces under James Douglas (the Black) defeat an English raiding party near Coldstream. During the skirmish, Edmond de Caillou (nephew of Piers Gaveston) is killed.
 May 2 – In an attempt to stir the Irish nobles into rebellion against English rule, Edward Bruce, brother of King Robert I (the Bruce), is crowned High King of Ireland.
 August 10 – Second Battle of Athenry: Norman rule is retained during the Bruce campaign in Ireland, at the cost of over 5,000 dead.
 The Pound sterling experiences the greatest year of inflation in its history, at 100.04 percent, losing over half its value.

 Asia 
 January 4 – Sultan Alauddin Khalji of the Delhi Sultanate dies after a 19-year reign at Delhi. He is succeeded by his 5-year-old son, Shihabuddin Omar, with the support of Alauddin's general Malik Kafur. During his reign, a power struggle occurres between Malik Kafur and the Khalji family.
 February – Malik Kafur is assassinated by Alauddin's former bodyguards. The 17-year-old Qutb al-Din Mubarak, son of Alauddin Khalji, succeeds him and ascends the throne as ruler of the Delhi Sultanate on April 14.

 By topic 

 Religion 
 August 7 – After an interregnum (or sede vacante) of two years, due to disagreements between the cardinals, John XXII is elected as successor to Clement V (see 1314). He becomes the 196th pope of Rome (until 1334).

Births 
 March 2 – Robert II, king of Scotland (House of Stuart) (d. 1390)
 April 11 – Édouard I, French nobleman, knight and marshal (d. 1351)
 May 14 – Charles IV (Wenceslaus), Holy Roman Emperor (d. 1378)
 August 15 – John of Eltham, English nobleman and prince (d. 1336)
 November 7 – Simeon of Moscow, Russian Grand Prince (d. 1353)
 November 15 – John I (the Posthumous), king of France (d. 1316)
 date unknown 
 An-Nasir Ahmad, Mamluk ruler (House of Bahri) (d. 1344)
 Choe Yeong, Korean nobleman and general (d. 1388)
 Fa Ngum, Tai nobleman and ruler of Lan Xang (d. 1393)
 Henry II, Polish nobleman, knight and co-ruler (d. 1345)
 Ibn Arafa, Tunisian scholar, imam and theologian (d. 1401)
 John Beauchamp, English nobleman and admiral (d. 1360)
 Magnus IV (or VII), king of Sweden (House of Bjelbo) (d. 1374)
 Nicholas Eymerich, Spanish inquisitor and theologian (d. 1399)
 Niphon of Kafsokalyvia, Greek monk, mystic and writer (d. 1411)
 Otho Holand, English nobleman, knight and governor (d. 1359)
 Renaud de Carteret, French nobleman and rebel leader (d. 1382)
 Robert de Herle, English nobleman, knight and admiral (d. 1364)
 Simon Sudbury, English cleric, bishop and archbishop (d. 1381)

Deaths 
 January 4 – Alauddin Khalji, Indian governor and ruler (b. 1266)
 February 18 – Nicholas II of Werle, German nobleman (b. 1274)
 March 2 – Marjorie Bruce, Scottish noblewoman and princess
 March 12 – Stefan Dragutin, king of Serbia (House of Nemanjić)
 March 13 – John Devereux, Anglo-Norman nobleman (b. 1250)
 May 4 – Reginald of Bar, French archdeacon, bishop and writer
 May 5 – Elizabeth of Rhuddlan, English noblewoman (b. 1282)
 June 5 – Louis X (the Quarrelsome), king of France (b. 1289)
 June 29 – Henry Woodlock, English prior and bishop (b. 1250)
 July 5 – (Battle of Manolada)
 Ferdinand of Majorca, Spanish nobleman and prince
 John II of Nivelet, Latin nobleman, knight and prince
 July 10 – Leszek of Dobrzyń, Polish nobleman and prince 
 July 18 – Yasokjin, Mongol noblewoman and queen consort
 July 27 – Theobald de Verdun, English nobleman (b. 1278)
 August 2 – Louis of Burgundy, French nobleman and prince
 August 17 – Albert I, German nobleman (House of Ascania)
 August 30 – Giovanni Pipino I, Italian nobleman and knight
 September 10 – John FitzGerald, Anglo-Norman nobleman
 November 20 – John I (the Posthumous), king of France
 November 26 – Robert Wishart, Scottish bishop (b. 1240)
 December 16 – Öljaitü, Mongol viceroy and ruler (b. 1282)
 December 17 – Juan Fernández, Spanish bishop-elect
 December 18 – Gilbert Segrave, English bishop (b. 1266)
 December 22 – Giles of Rome, Italian theologian (b. 1243)
 date unknown
 Berenguer Estañol, Latin nobleman and vicar general
 Edmond de Caillou, French nobleman and favourite
 Geoffroy d'Ablis, French Dominican priest and inquisitor
 Guillaume Guiart (or Guiard), French chronicler and poet
 Guo Shoujing, Chinese astronomer and engineer (b. 1231)
 John of Argyll (the Lame), Scottish nobleman and admiral
 Malik Kafur, Indian general, governor and viceroy (na'ib)
 Matilda of Brandenburg, German noblewoman and regent
 Michael Kantakouzenos, Byzantine general and governor
 Najm al-Din al-Tufi, Arab scholar and theologian (b. 1276)
 Sang Sapurba, Indonesian nobleman and ruler (b. 1245)
 Shihab-ud-din Omar, Indian ruler of the Delhi Sultanate 
 Simon Montagu, English nobleman and admiral (b. 1259)
 Ulrich of Sanneck, German nobleman and knight (b. 1255)
 Vytenis, Lithuanian nobleman and Grand Prince (b. 1260)
 William Ros, Scottish nobleman and claimant (b. 1255)

References